The 1962 United States Senate election in Alaska took place on November 6, 1962. Incumbent Democratic U.S. Senator Ernest Gruening ran for a second (his first full) term in office and defeated Republican nominee, Anchorage lawyer, former Interior Solicitor & former U.S. Attorney Ted Stevens.

Stevens was appointed to Alaska's other (Class II) U.S. Senate seat in 1968, following the death of Bob Bartlett and served for over forty years, serving as President pro tempore, and winning seven elections until his defeat in 2008.

Democratic primary

Candidates
 Ernest Gruening, incumbent U.S. Senator since 1959
 Robert L. Veach

Results

Republican primary

Candidates
 Frank Cook
 Ted Stevens, former U.S. Attorney for the Fourth Division of Alaska Territory, Solicitor of the Department of the Interior, and Alaskan statehood activist

Results

General election

See also 
 1962 United States Senate elections

References

1962
Alaska
United States Senate